Víctor Mora (6 June 1931  – 17 August 2016) was a Spanish comic book writer.

Born in Barcelona, Mora created and wrote the series Capitán Trueno, El Jabato,  (art by Carlos Giménez), El Cosaco Verde, and El Corsario de Hierro, Chroniques de l'innomé Collection Pilote, drawn by Luis García.

Sources
 Entrevista con Víctor Mora 

1931 births
2016 deaths
Spanish comics writers
Spanish male writers
Writers from Catalonia
Artists from Barcelona